The men's 50 kilometres race walk at the 1971 European Athletics Championships was held in Helsinki, Finland, on 14 August 1971.

Medalists

Results

Final
14 August

Participation
According to an unofficial count, 25 athletes from 12 countries participated in the event.

 (1)
 (3)
 (1)
 (2)
 (2)
 (1)
 (1)
 (3)
 (3)
 (2)
 (3)
 (3)

References

50 kilometres race walk
Racewalking at the European Athletics Championships